Virginia Susan Sosnowski (born December 20, 1955) is an American politician who is a Democratic member of the Rhode Island Senate, representing the 37th District, which encompasses the towns of South Kingstown and New Shoreham. She is the owner and operator of Sosnowski Farms, a family farm in West Kingston. Sosnowski was first elected on November 5, 1996 and is serving in her 8th term.

Education and early career
Sosnowski was born Virginia Susan Arnold on December 20, 1955 to Herbert L. Arnold and Virginia (King) Arnold and received her diploma from Chariho High School in 1973.  She went on to receive an associate degree from the Ocean State Business Institute in 1982. Sosnowski worked in retail sales at Fleming's Department Store in the village of Wyoming, Rhode Island from 1980 to 1984. She then worked as a sod harvester for Green Valley Turf Farm from 1984 to 1988, and as a manager/supervisor for Laurel Brook Farm from 1984 to 1990. Along with her husband Michael, she has been co-owner/operator of Sosnowski Farms since 1984. Prior to election to the Senate, she served six years as an appointed member on the Planning Board of the Town of South Kingstown.

Political career
Sosnowski was first elected to the Rhode Island Senate as a Republican on November 5, 1996 to the 6th district, defeating first-term incumbent Democrat Edward F. Holland by a margin of 55% to 45%. A dispute with Republican Party leadership led her to join the Democratic Party during the 1998 session, then running as a Democrat during the 1998 election she defeated Republican challenger Martha A. Stamp by a margin of 73% to 27%.  Upon downsizing of the Senate from 50 to 38 members in the 2002 election, Sosnowski defeated Republican Challenger Anna F. Prager by a margin of 63% to 37% and elected to serve in the 37th District. Sosnowski was reelected on November 2, 2010 defeating Independent challenger Kevin R. O'Neill by a margin of 51.4% to 48.9%.

From 2001 to 2007, Sosnowski was the senate appointee to the Rhode Island Coastal Resources Management Council. From 2007 to 2010, she served as Rhode Island's Legislative Commissioner to the Atlantic States Marine Fisheries Commission. She is currently serving as Chairwoman of the Senate Committee on Environment & Agriculture, and serves as a member on the Senate Committee on Finance, Senate Committee on Government Oversight and Senate Committee on Health & Human Services.

Selected legislation as enacted
2000-S2470SubB  An Act Relating to Motor Vehicle Offenses (0.08) DUI: Reduced the maximum blood alcohol concentration from 0.1% to 0.08% when determining whether an individual has been operating an automobile under the influence of alcohol.
2004-S2029SubB  An Act Relating to Health and Safety-Rhode Island Workers' Safety Act of 2004: Banned smoking in restaurants, bars, malls, health care facilities, schools, public restrooms, public transit.
2004-S2097SubA  An Act Relating to Groundwater Protection: Added limitations for solid waste facilities in groundwater protection areas as designated by local zoning ordinances and the RI water resources board.
2006-S2451SubA An Act Relating to Operators' Licenses -- Mobile Telephone Use Prohibited:  Prohibited drivers under the age of 18 from using cell phones while operating a motor vehicle on the highway.
2006-S2499SubAaa An Act Relating to Agriculture and Forestry: Aimed to preserve agricultural rights by limiting the effect of changes in rules and regulations that would impair the ability to continue farming.
2007-S0081SubA An Act Relating to Education Health and Safety of Pupils: Required all senior high schools to offer healthier snacks and beverages through their vending machines as of Jan. 1, 2008.
2007-S1144  An Act Relating to Health and Safety—R.I. Cesspool Act of 2007: Phased out the use of cesspools that present the highest risk to public health and/or the environment effective June 1, 2008.
2008-S2797SubA Recycling - An Act Relating to Health and Safety:  This act provided that each city and town that contracts with the R.I. Resource Recovery Corporation for the disposal of its solid waste must recycle 35% of its solid waste and divert 50% of its solid waste by 2011.
2008-S2608SubAa  An Act Relating to Public Utilities and Carriers: Prevented the shut off of gas or electric in any residence where there is a domiciled person under the age of 2 years old.
2009-S0732SubAaa The Water Use and Government Efficiency Act of 2009:  This act improved efficiency in the state's water use through conservation—ensured availability of water for priority uses; economic development, drinking water, farming, firefighting—delivers water Rhode Islanders need for priority uses while protecting natural resources.
2009-S0204SubB An Act Relating to Motor Vehicle Offenses:  Banned texting while driving.
2010-S2819SubAaa An Act Relating to Public Utilities and Carriers-Contracting Standard for Renewable Energy: Authorized Narragansett Electric to enter into an amended agreement with developer of offshore wind for purchase of energy, capacity and other environmental and market attributes as long as the provisions of the general laws pertaining to the Town of New Shoreham project are complied with.

Proposed legislation
Sosnowski has backed amending the "good time" law, a "law that allows convicted criminals early release for good behavior." This would specifically prohibit "several offenses from being eligible for time off for good behavior, including murder, kidnapping of a minor, first-degree sexual assault and first- or second-degree child molestation." Her amendment passed the Rhode Island State Senate with a vote of 32-2 in May 2011. In February 2012, the bill headed to the State House of Representatives. If approved, it would take effect starting July 1, 2012. A March 2012 article by WPRO/630 mentions that the legislation is "in response to the planned early release of a man who killed a 5-year-old boy and kept his shellacked bones for years."

Sosnowski, along with Louis P. DiPalma, Juan M. Pichardo, John J. Tassoni, and Walter S. Felag, Jr., proposed Senate bill S2755 on March 8, 2012. Released in connection with House bill H7933, the Senate bill would bring relief to uninsured children with disabilities that are not eligible for Medicaid because of income. The National Health Interview Survey (NHIS) revealed that 8 percent of children in the U.S. have significant disabilities. Many families of these children are forced to remain low-income in order to qualify for healthcare for their children. Sosnowski's Senate bill S2755 aims to ensure that families would be able to access the Medicaid buy-in regardless of income.

Personal life
Susan and her husband Michael Sosnowski have four children: Ronald, Deborah, Stephen, and Michael, Jr. Her and Michael's family farm uses organic farming techniques. Groups that she is involved in include: Northeast Organic Farming Association, Richmond Grange, South Kingstown Farmer's Market Association, Wakefield Rotary, and RI Nursery and Landscape Association.

References

External links
Rhode Island Senate - Senator V. Susan Sosnowski

Democratic Party Rhode Island state senators
1955 births
Living people
People from Richmond, Rhode Island
People from South Kingstown, Rhode Island
Farmers from Rhode Island
American women farmers
Women state legislators in Rhode Island
21st-century American politicians
21st-century American women politicians